The eighth season of The Bachelor premiered on 12 August 2020. This season features Locky Gilbert, a 30-year-old adventure tour guide from Perth, Western Australia. Gilbert previously appeared on the fourth and seventh seasons of Australian Survivor, where he finished in fifth and twelfth place respectively.

As a result of the COVID-19 pandemic, filming in the mansion was suspended midway through the season. Two virtual episodes (referred to "Love In Lockdown" on the show) were produced during the hiatus via virtually through videoconferences. Production resumed in June throughout Australia on a lockdown format, Osher Günsberg continued to host at the mansion in Sydney, while Gilbert was isolated in Perth and the remaining contestants in their respective hometowns, the show stated that they would be unable to ensure the safety of contestants and crew, especially with the need for safety precautions which would need to be implemented and government restrictions such as social distancing and travel bans.

Contestants
The season began with 23 contestants. Kaitlyn entered as an intruder in episode 2, and Bec entered as an intruder in episode 9, bringing the total number of contestants to 25.

Call-out order
Note that the competition was suspended at the end of Episode 7 due to the COVID-19 pandemic, and resumed a few months later on a virtual format via video conference.

 The contestant received the triple threat rose, which guarantees one Bachelorette a single date, a group date and a visit to the Bachelor Pad.
 The contestant received a rose during the date.
 The contestant received a rose outside of a date or the rose ceremony.
 The contestant was eliminated.
 The contestant was eliminated outside the rose ceremony.
 The contestant was eliminated during the date.
 The contestant quit the competition.
 The contestant won the competition.

Notes

Episodes

Episode 1
Original airdate: 12 August 2020

Episode 2
Original airdate: 13 August 2020

Episode 3
Original airdate: 19 August 2020

Episode 4
Original airdate: 20 August 2020

Episode 5
Original airdate: 26 August 2020

Episode 6
Original airdate: 27 August 2020

Episode 7
Original airdate: 2 September 2020

Episode 8
Original airdate: 3 September 2020

Episode 9
Original airdate: 9 September 2020

Episode 10
Original airdate: 10 September 2020

Episode 11
Original airdate: 16 September 2020

Episode 12
Original airdate: 17 September 2020

Episode 13
Original airdate: 23 September 2020

Episode 14
Original airdate: 24 September 2020

Ratings

References

Australian (season 08)
Television productions suspended due to the COVID-19 pandemic
2020 Australian television seasons
Television series impacted by the COVID-19 pandemic
Television shows filmed in Australia